New York's 37th State Assembly district is one of the 150 districts in the New York State Assembly. It has been represented by Juan Ardila since 2023, succeeding Catherine Nolan, who chose not to seek re-election.

Geography 
District 37 is located in Queens.

2020s
It contains the neighborhoods of Sunnyside, Sunnyside Gardens, and portions of Ridgewood, Long Island City and Maspeth.

2010s
It contains the neighborhoods of Sunnyside, Ridgewood, portions of Astoria, Woodside, Long Island City, Maspeth, Queensbridge, Ravenswood, Dutch Kills and Blissville.

Recent election results

2022

2020

2018

2016

2014

2012

2010

References

35